Masakazu Tashiro (born June 26, 1988) is a Japanese football player who currently plays for the Iwate Grulla Morioka  in J3 League.

Club statistics
Updated to 1 March 2019.

References

External links
Profile at V-Varen Nagasaki 
Profile at Yokohama F. Marinos

1988 births
Living people
Association football people from Tokyo
Japanese footballers
J1 League players
J2 League players
J3 League players
Japan Football League players
Yokohama F. Marinos players
FC Machida Zelvia players
JEF United Chiba players
Montedio Yamagata players
V-Varen Nagasaki players
Yokohama FC players
Omiya Ardija players
Iwate Grulla Morioka players
Association football defenders